Anna Dyvik (born 31 December 1994) is a Swedish cross-country skier who represents the club IFK Mora SK.

She competed at the FIS Nordic World Ski Championships 2017 in Lahti, Finland.

On 17 March 2023, Anna Dyvik announced her retirement following the 2022–2023 season.

Cross-country skiing results
All results are sourced from the International Ski Federation (FIS).

Olympic Games

World Championships

World Cup

Season standings

Team podiums
 1 podium – (1 )

References 

1994 births
Living people
Swedish female cross-country skiers
Cross-country skiers at the 2018 Winter Olympics
Cross-country skiers at the 2022 Winter Olympics
Olympic cross-country skiers of Sweden
21st-century Swedish women